Paul William Riley is a Scottish actor and comedian. He is best known for his role as Winston Ingram in the Scottish sitcom, Still Game. Previously he had worked on Chewin' the Fat, the sketch show from which Still Game was spun-off. Riley also starred in, wrote and directed Dear Green Place, again with Ford Kiernan from Still Game.

Awards 
On 1 November 2006, it was announced that Riley had been nominated for a BAFTA Scotland award for his role as pensioner Winston Ingram in Still Game. He was up against Barry Jones and Stuart McLeod in their show, Tricks from the Bible. On 12 November, Riley won the award, also picking up the "Best Entertainment" category as well for Dear Green Place.

References

External links
 

Living people
Scottish male comedians
Scottish male television actors
Comedians from Glasgow
Male actors from Glasgow
1962 births